RCS-8 (also known as 1-(2-cyclohexylethyl)-3-(2-methoxyphenylacetyl)indole, SR-18, and BTM-8) is a synthetic cannabinoid that has been found as an ingredient of "herbal" synthetic cannabis blends. It can be described as an analogue of JWH-250 with the 1-pentyl group replaced by 1-(2-cyclohexylethyl), and can be expected to be less potent than JWH-250 (cf. JWH-007 and its cyclohexylethyl analogue). Despite not having been reported in the scientific or patent literature as yet, reputed recreational use of RCS-8 in the United States has led to it being specifically listed in a proposed 2011 amendment to the Controlled Substances Act, aiming to add a number of synthetic drugs into Schedule I.  In addition, all CB1 receptor agonists of the 3-phenylacetylindole class such as RCS-8 are Schedule I Controlled Substances.

See also 
Cannabipiperidiethanone
JWH-250
RCS-4

References 

Phenylacetylindoles
Designer drugs